The 1976–77 season was Manchester United's 75th season in the Football League, and their second consecutive season in the top division of English football. They finished the season sixth in the league and won the FA Cup to end a nine-year spell without a major trophy. Despite this success, it was to be their last season under the management of Tommy Docherty, who had been at the helm for four-and-a-half years and revived United following several years of decline. During the close season, he was dismissed by the club after revealing his love affair with the wife of the club's physiotherapist.

First Division

FA Cup

League Cup

UEFA Cup

Squad statistics

References

Manchester United F.C. seasons
Manchester United